Jim Hogg County is a county located in the U.S. state of Texas.  As of the 2020 census, the population was 4,838. Its county seat is Hebbronville. The county is named for James Stephen Hogg, the governor of Texas from 1891 to 1895.

History
Jim Hogg County was formed in 1913 from portions of Brooks and Duval counties. It was named after Jim Hogg, the 20th Governor of Texas, and the first governor born in the state of Texas.

Geography

Major highways
  State Highway 16
  State Highway 285
  Farm to Market Road 1017

Adjacent counties
 Duval County (north)
 Brooks County (east)
 Starr County (south)
 Zapata County (west)
 Webb County (northwest)

Demographics

As of the 2020 United States census, there were 4,838 people, 1,545 households, and 1,111 families residing in the county.

As of the census of 2000, there were 5,281 people, 1,815 households, and 1,359 families residing in the county.  The population density was 5 people per square mile (2/km2).  There were 2,308 housing units at an average density of 2 per square mile (1/km2).  The racial makeup of the county was 80.44% White, 0.45% Black or African American, 0.78% Native American, 0.21% Asian, 15.83% from other races, and 2.29% from two or more races.  89.98% of the population were Hispanic or Latino of any race.

There were 1,815 households, out of which 38.50% had children under the age of 18 living with them, 55.20% were married couples living together, 14.60% had a female householder with no husband present, and 25.10% were non-families. 23.40% of all households were made up of individuals, and 12.30% had someone living alone who was 65 years of age or older.  The average household size was 2.89 and the average family size was 3.43.

In the county, the population was spread out, with 31.60% under the age of 18, 8.10% from 18 to 24, 24.60% from 25 to 44, 21.10% from 45 to 64, and 14.60% who were 65 years of age or older.  The median age was 34 years. For every 100 females there were 96.70 males.  For every 100 females age 18 and over, there were 92.10 males.

The median income for a household in the county was $25,833, and the median income for a family was $29,844. Males had a median income of $28,150 versus $18,750 for females. The per capita income for the county was $12,185.  About 24.20% of families and 25.90% of the population were below the poverty line, including 29.80% of those under age 18 and 30.20% of those age 65 or over.

Politics
The county is historically Democratic. Since the county was founded in 1913, every Democratic candidate has carried the county. Over the entire nation only Brooks County, Texas and Menominee County, Wisconsin can make a similar claim since its foundation, and only neighbouring Starr and Duval Counties plus Northampton County, North Carolina also possess this distinction in elections since Jim Hogg County was founded. The Democratic candidate has consistently received more than 65 percent of the county's vote from 1972 to 2016, although in 2020 the Democratic vote percentage declined to 58.8%. Jim Hogg was one of the few counties in Texas that voted for Senator John Kerry of Massachusetts over the incumbent George W. Bush. Kerry won by almost a 2-to-1 majority. He received 1,344 votes while Bush only received 712 votes.

Education

All of the county is served by the Jim Hogg County Independent School District.

The district has three schools: Hebbronville Elementary School, Hebbronville Junior High School, and Hebbronville High School. All of the schools are considered to be in the Hebbronville community.

Residents are zoned to Laredo Community College.

Communities

Census-designated places
 Guerra
 Hebbronville (county seat)
 Las Lomitas
 South Fork Estates
 Thompsonville

Unincorporated communities
 Agua Nueva
 Randado

See also

 Recorded Texas Historic Landmarks in Jim Hogg County

Notes

References

External links
 
 Jim Hogg County Profile from the Texas Association of Counties 

 
1913 establishments in Texas
Populated places established in 1913
Majority-minority counties in Texas
Hispanic and Latino American culture in Texas